In the pre-Christian religion of Eastern and Southern Slavs, Rod (Slovenian, Croatian: Rod, Belarusian, Bulgarian, Macedonian, Russian, Serbian Cyrillic: Род, Ukrainian Cyrillic: Рід) is the god of the family, ancestors and fate, perhaps as the supreme god. Among Southern Slavs, he is also known as Sud ("(the) Judge"). He is usually mentioned together with Rozhanitsy deities (among Southern Slavs, the Sudzenitsy). One's first haircut (postriziny) was dedicated to him, in a celebration in which he and the rozhanitsy were given a meal and the cut hair. His cult lost its importance through time, and in the ninth or tenth century he was replaced by Perun, Svarog and/or Svetevid, which explains his absence in the pantheon of Vladimir the Great.

Etymology 
Rod's name is confirmed in Old Church Slavonic and Old East Slavic sources about pre-Christian Slavic religion. The name is derived from the Proto-Slavic word *rodъ, meaning "family", "birth", "origin", "clan", but also "yield", "harvest", and this word is in turn derived from the Proto-Indo-European root *wréh₂ds "root". Aleksander Brückner also notes the similarity of the name to the Avestan word rada-, meaning "guardian", "keeper".

Sources 
The first source mentioning Rod is the Word of St. Gregory Theologian about how pagans bowed to idols, from the 11th century:

Word of Chrystolubiec describes the prayers dedicated to Rod and the rozhanitsy:

In a handwritten commentary on the Gospel from the 15th century, Rod defies the Christian god as the creator of humans:

The cult of Rod was still popular in 16th-century Rus, as evidenced by the penance given during confession by Orthodox priests as described in the penitentiaries of Saint Sabbas of Storozhi:

Cult 
According to ethnologist Halyna Lozko, Rod's Holiday was celebrated on December 23, or according to Czech historian and archaeologist Naďa Profantová, on December 26. Rod and the rozhanitsy were offered bloodless sacrifices in the form of bread, honey, cheese and groat (kutia). Before consuming the kutia, the father of the family, who took up the role of the volkhv or zhretsa, tossed the first spoon up to the holy corner. This custom exists in Ukraine to this day. Then the feast began at a table in the shape of a trapezium. After the feast, they made requests to Rod and the rozhanitsy: "let all good things be born".

In Rus, after Christianization, feasts dedicated to Rod were still practiced, as mentioned in the Word of Chrystolubiec. In the first years of the existence of Saint Sophia's Cathedral in Kyiv, pagans came to celebrate Koliada there, which was later severely punished. The remains of the Rod cult were to survive until the 19th century.

Interpretations

Scholars' opinions

Boris Rybakov 
According to the concept presented by Boris Rybakov, Rod was originally the chief Slavic deity during the times of patriarchal agricultural societies in the first millennium CE, later pushed to a lower position, which would explain his absence in the pantheon of deities worshiped by Vladimir the Great. Rybakov relied on the Word of St. Gregory Theologian..., where the Slavs first sacrificed to wraiths, then to Rod and rozhanitsy, and finally to Perun, which would reflect the alleged evolution of Slavic beliefs from animism through cult of natural forces to henotheism. The sculpture known as Zbruch Idol was supposed to depict Rod as the main Slavic deity according to Rybakov's concept.

Rybakov also believes that all the circles and spiral symbols represent the different hypostases of Rod. Such symbols are to be "six-petal rose inscribed in a circle" (rosette) and the sign of the Thunderer.

Leo Klejn and Mikola Zubov 
These scholars criticized Rybakov's findings. In one of his works, Rybakov maintained that Perun could not be borrowed by the Vainakhs, since the supreme god of the Slavs was Rod, and Perun was introduced only by Vladimir as the druzhina patron. However, this is contradicted by the traces of Perun throughout Slavic territory. These researchers argue that it is necessary to identify traces of the original sources of texts and restore them to the historical context under which specific Old Russian texts were created. They believe that Old Russian authors, when describing Rod and rozhanitsy, used ready semantic blocks borrowed from other sources, mainly the Bible and writings of Greek theologians that were misinterpreted: in Byzantine Empire the horoscope was called "genealogy", which can literally be translated as "rodoslovo". Therefore, these researchers believe that the cult of Rod and parents did not exist in the pre-Christian religion of the Slavs. Zubov also believes that there was no extensive genealogy of the gods in the East Slav religion and Perun was the only god.

Aleksander Gieysztor 
Gieysztor considers Rod the god of social organization. After Benvenist he compares him to the Roman Quirinus, whose name comes from *covir or curia, which can be translated as "god of the community of husbands", to the Umbrian Vofionus, whose name contains a root similar to the Indo-European word *leudho, Anglo-Saxon leode ("people"), Slavic *ludie and Polish ludzie, and to the Celtic Toutatis, whose name derives from the Celtic core *teuta meaning "family", but rejects connecting Rod with Indian Rudra.

Because of the function of fertility and wealth, he identifies with him the Belarusian Spor, whose name means "abundance", "multiplicity".

Andrzej Szyjewski 
According to Andrzej Szyjewski, Rod "personifies the ideas of family kinship as a symbol of spiritual continuity (rodoslovo)." Rod was also to direct the souls of the dead to Vyraj, and then send them back to our world in the form of clods of earth cast down or entrusted to nightjars and storks.

Fyodor Kapitsa 
According to the folklorist Fyodor Kapitsa, the cult of Rod and parents was almost completely forgotten over time. Rod transformed into a ghost – a patron of the family, a "home grandfather", and later a guardian of newborns and honoring ancestors. Traces of Rod's cult were mainly seen in everyday life. Remains of the Rod cult are to be Russian Orthodox holidays such as Day of the Dead (Holy Thursday) and Radonica (Tuesday of the first week after Easter) during which the dead are worshiped.

In the times of Kievan Rus in the 11th and 12th centuries, the cult of Rod was to be particularly important for princes because he was considered the patron of the unity of the clan, and the right to the throne and land of ancestors depended on it. Since fertility has always been associated with femininity, Rod's cult was traditionally feminine. Thus, female priestesses were associated with the cult of Rod, who were to sacrifice him or organize special feasts several times a year. Bread, porridge, cheese and honey were prepared for the feast, then such a meal was put in the shrines. It was believed that the gods appear there invisible to the human eye. Rod was sometimes called to protect people from illness, but rozhanitsy played a major role in this ritual.

Oleg Kutarev 
Kutarev notes the similarity between the cult of Rod and the cult of the South Slavic Stopan and the East Slavic Domovoy – all were given a meal, they were to manage the fate and were associated with the worship of ancestors.

Viljo Mansikka 
This Russian and Finnish philologist notes that sometimes in the Slavic languages the Greek term "τύχη" (týchi, "luck") is translated as rod, and "είμαρμένη" (eímarméni, "destiny") is translated as a rozhanitsa.

Jan Máchal 
This Czech slavist claimed that Rod was a god who represented male ancestors and rozhanitsy represented female ancestors.

Halyna Lozko 
According to Halynaa Losko, for Ukrainians Rod was god over the gods. He is the giver of life and was supposed to stay in heaven, ride on clouds and assign man his fate. Rod was the personification of the descendants of one ancestor, that is, he was associated with the entire family: dead ancestors, living people and unborn generations. Over time, Rod became a Domovoy whose figurines were owned by many families. Rod's and rozhanitsy images were also to appear on the rushnyks as motives of the tree of life. The 20th-century ethnographic finds show the door of huts with the image of a family tree: men were depicted on leaves and women on flowers of this tree. When someone was dying – a cross was drawn next to his name, when someone was being born – a new twig, leaf or flower was drawn.

Rodnovers' opinions 

Russian volkhs Veleslav (Ilya Cherkasov) and Dobroslav (Alexey Dobrovolsky) describe Rod as a life force, the god "all-pervading" and "omnipresent." In cosmology, considered the source of cosmic emanation, which is expressed in the hierarchy of the gods.

References

Bibliography 
 
 
 
 
 
 
 
 
 
 
 
 
 

Creator gods
Slavic gods
Slavic fortune deities